Ippolito Niccolini (3 January 1848 – 8 January 1919) was an Italian businessman and politician. He was the 8th mayor of Florence, Italy.

References

1848 births
1919 deaths
19th-century Italian politicians
20th-century Italian politicians
Italian businesspeople
Mayors of Florence